Ancylosis syrtella is a species of snout moth in the genus Ancylosis. It was described by Ragonot in 1887. It is found in Russia.

The wingspan is about 18 mm.

References

Moths described in 1887
syrtella
Moths of Europe